Southwest Aceh Regency is a regency  in the Aceh special region of Indonesia. It is located on the island of Sumatra. The regency covers an area of 1,882.05 square kilometres and according to the 2010 census had a population of 126,036; this rose to 140,366 at the 2015 Census, and to 150,775 at the 2020 Census; the official estimate as at mid 2021 was 152,657. The seat of the regency government is at Blangpidie.

Administrative districts 
The regency is divided administratively into nine districts (kecamatan), tabulated below with their areas (in km2) and their populations at the 2010 Census and the 2020 Census, together with the official estimates as at mid 2021. The table also includes the locations of the district administrative centres, the number of villages (rural desa and urban kelurahan) in each district, and its postal codes.

See also 

 List of regencies and cities of Indonesia

References 

 
Regencies of Aceh